Kevin Dick (born 27 October 1957), also known by the nickname of "Iron Teddy Bear", is an English former professional rugby league footballer who played in the 1970s, 1980s and 1990s. He played at representative level for Great Britain, and at club level for Leeds, Hull FC, Halifax and Huddersfield, as a goal-kicking , i.e. number 7.

Background
Kevin Dick's birth was registered in Leeds district, West Riding of Yorkshire, England, he has worked as a roofer. Kevin Dick is the son of the rugby league footballer who played in the 1950s for Leeds and Batley, Alec Dick.

Playing career

International honours
Kevin Dick won caps for Great Britain while at Leeds in 1980 against New Zealand (2 matches).

Challenge Cup Final appearances
Kevin Dick played , and scored a try, 2-goals, a penalty, and a drop goal in Leeds' 15–6 victory over Widnes in the 1977 Challenge Cup Final during the 1976–77 season at Wembley Stadium, London on Saturday 7 May 1977, in front of a crowd of 80,871, and played as an interchange/substitute in the 14–12 victory over St. Helens in the 1978 Challenge Cup Final during the 1977–78 season at Wembley Stadium, London on Saturday 13 May 1978, in front of a crowd of 96,000.

County Cup Final appearances
Kevin Dick played , and scored 3-goals in Leeds' 15–6 victory over Halifax in the 1979 Yorkshire County Cup Final during the 1979–80 season at Headingley Rugby Stadium, Leeds on Saturday 27 October 1979, and played , was man of the match winning the White Rose Trophy, and scored 2-goals and a drop goal in the 8–7 victory over Hull Kingston Rovers in the 1980 Yorkshire County Cup Final during the 1980–81 season at Fartown Ground, Huddersfield on Saturday 8 November 1980.

John Player Trophy/John Player Special Trophy Final appearances
Kevin Dick played , and scored 2-goals in Leeds' 4–15 defeat by Wigan in the 1982–83 John Player Trophy Final during the 1982–83 season at Elland Road, Leeds on Saturday 22 January 1983, and played , and scored a try in the 18–10 victory over Widnes in the 1983–84 John Player Special Trophy Final during the 1983–84 season at Central Park, Wigan on Saturday 14 January 1984.

Club career
Kevin Dick made his début for Leeds in 1975, and was transferred from Leeds to Hull F.C. in 1986 in exchange for Trevor Skerrett and Andy Gascoigne.

References

External links
!Great Britain Statistics at englandrl.co.uk (statistics currently missing due to not having appeared for both Great Britain, and England)
(archived by web.archive.org) Stats → Past Players → "D"
(archived by web.archive.org) Statistics at hullfc.com
Search for "Kevin Dick" at britishnewspaperarchive.co.uk

1957 births
Living people
English rugby league players
Great Britain national rugby league team players
Halifax R.L.F.C. players
Huddersfield Giants players
Hull F.C. players
Leeds Rhinos players
Rugby league players from Leeds
Rugby league halfbacks